The Minerals Council of Australia (MCA) is an industry association, notable for representing companies that generate most of Australia's mining output.  The MCA was founded in 1995, succeeding the Australian Mining Industry Council which was established in 1960. It is unrelated to the former Australian Minerals Council, which was established in 1946 as an intergovernmental forum between state and federal government ministers.

Activities
In an effort to integrate sustainability concepts into the mining industry members of the Council must release sustainability reports.  Annual reports into the mining industry's safety and health performance data are published to encourage continuous improvement.

The Minerals Council is an associate member of the World Coal Association.  It has opposed climate movement campaigns seeking to persuade companies, universities and others to divest from coal and other fossil fuels.

Lobbying 
The Minerals Council spent $15.78 million on advertising opposing the Minerals Resource Rent Tax and Resources Super Profits Tax in 2010. The group spent close to $23 million in advertising during 2011 and 2012, then $1.67 million in the 2013 election year, and $60,000 in 2014. Three weeks before the 2015 Paris conference on climate change, the group launched a "coal is amazing" campaign. The campaign asserted that carbon capture and storage is "now a reality" despite only one facility operating in the world, and no plans to bring facilities online in Australia until the 2020s. In the 2015 budget, the Abbott Government cut $460 million from CCS projects.

Governance 
The Minerals Council of Australia is governed by a board of directors. As of November 2021, board membership includes representatives from the following resources companies: Anglo American, AngloGold Ashanti. BHP, Glencore, Newcrest, Newmont, Peabody Energy, Rio Tinto, Thiess, Whitehaven Coal and Yancoal.

Nuclear energy support 
In 2017, the Minerals Council of Australia called on the Australian government to reverse legislation banning developing nuclear energy. Following MP appeal in previous March, five reasons were given to support the removal of the nuclear energy ban: reliability, low carbon emissions, proven technology, affordability and safety.

References

External links
Official website

Mining organisations in Australia
Organisations based in the Australian Capital Territory
1995 establishments in Australia